Lodi Township may refer to:

 Lodi Township, Washtenaw County, Michigan
 Lodi Township, Mower County, Minnesota
 Lodi Township, Bergen County, New Jersey
 Lodi Township, Athens County, Ohio
 Lodi Township, Spink County, South Dakota, in Spink County, South Dakota

Township name disambiguation pages